In the game of cricket, the cricket pitch consists of the central strip of the cricket field between the wickets. The surface is flat and is normally covered with extremely short grass, but can be completely dry or dusty soil with barely any grass or, in some circumstances (that are rarely seen in high level cricket), made from an artificial material. Over the course of a cricket match, the pitch is not repaired or altered other than in special circumstances - meaning that it will change condition. Any grass on the pitch in the game's first over, for example, may have disappeared by twentieth over due to wear.

As almost all deliveries bowled will bounce off the pitch towards the batter, the state and type of a cricket pitch can significantly affect the outcome of a match. For example, a dusty, very dry, pitch will favour spin bowling because the ball will grip more on a dusty pitch - giving the team with the superior spin bowlers a significant advantage in the match. The state of the pitch is so important to the outcome of a cricket match that home teams can be fined or docked points if they produce a poor pitch that is deemed unfit for normal play, or seen to be a danger to batters by the ball behaving erratically when pitching on it. Players can face disciplinary action if they are seen to be deliberately damaging or altering the pitch in ways that are not allowed by the Laws of Cricket. Because of this, coaches, players, commentators and pundits will make much of how the pitch is "behaving" during a cricket match, especially during a first class or a Test match that takes place over several days, wherein the condition of the pitch can change significantly over that period. These conditions will impact on the decision at the coin toss at the beginning of the game, as to whether batting first or bowling first is more advantageous. For example, a captain will prefer to bat first if the pitch is "flat" and presumably easier to bat on, but may be tempted to bowl first on a greener, more moist pitch that favours movement of the ball early.

In amateur matches in some parts of the world, artificial pitches are sometimes used. These can be a slab of concrete overlaid with a coir mat or artificial turf. Sometimes dirt is put over the coir mat to provide an authentic feeling pitch. Artificial pitches are rare in professional cricket, being used only when exhibition matches are played in regions where cricket is not a common sport.

The pitch has specific markings delineating the creases, as specified by the Laws of Cricket.

The word wicket often occurs in reference to the pitch. Although technically incorrect according to the Laws of Cricket (Law 6 covers the pitch and Law 8 the wickets, distinguishing between them), cricket players, followers, and commentators persist in the usage, with context eliminating any possible ambiguity. Track or deck are other synonyms for pitch.

The rectangular central area of the cricket field – the space used for pitches – is known as the square. Cricket pitches are usually oriented as close to the north-south direction as practical, because the low afternoon sun would be dangerous for a batter facing due west.

Uses of the pitch 
The pitch has one popping crease at each of its ends, with these dividing the field into the two Ground (cricket)#Parts of the pitch, and the area in between (including the creases) in which the ball must be bowled and the batsmen run. 
 Bowling: Bowlers can bowl the ball by throwing it and making it bounce on the ground of the pitch. The return creases, which follow almost directly from the edges of the pitch down the field, restrict the angle the bowler may bowl from. 
 Batting: Batters may occasionally move around the pitch (particularly their crease in an effort to make contact with the ball). They may also make small marks on the pitch to indicate where they will stand, and while batting, they sometimes swing the bat in such a way that it hits some of the dirt in the pitch in the air.
 Running: The two batters may run along the sides of the pitch, between the batter's grounds, to score runs.
 Fielding: Occasionally fielders (often the bowler) may run on the pitch to run out a batter.
 Practice Session: Before a live cricket match, players have practice sessions with their official coach. They played and checked the circumstances of the pitch. They cannot use the main pitch. They’re just allowed to check the surface of the original pitch where the match will be played.

At any given moment, one end of the pitch will be the striker's end, while the other end is the non-striker's end. After each over, the ends swap. During the game, the bowler bowls from the nonstriker's end to the striker at the other end.

Protected area

The protected area or danger area is the central portion of the pitch – a rectangle running down the middle of the pitch, two feet wide, and beginning five feet from each popping crease. Under the Laws of Cricket, a bowler must avoid running on this area during their follow-through after delivering the ball.

The pitch is protected to preserve fairness in the game; the ball normally bounces on the pitch within this region, and if it is scuffed or damaged by the bowler's footmarks it can give an unfair advantage to the bowling side. These areas can be exploited by the bowlers to change the outcome of the match. If a bowler runs on the protected area, an umpire will issue a warning to the bowler and to their team captain. The umpire issues a second and final warning if the bowler transgresses again. On the third offence, the umpire will eject the bowler from the attack and the bowler may not bowl again for the remainder of the innings. The rule does not prevent the bowler or any other fielder from running on the protected area in an effort to field the ball; it applies only to the uninterrupted follow-through.

State of the pitch

A natural pitch with grass longer or more moist than usual is described as a green pitch, green top, or green seamer. This favours the bowler over the batter as the ball can be made to behave erratically on longer or wet grass. Most club and social cricket is played on pitches that professional cricketers would call green.

A sticky wicket – a pitch that has become wet and is subsequently drying out, often rapidly in hot sun – causes the ball to behave erratically, particularly for the slower or spin bowlers. However, modern pitches are generally protected from rain and dew before and during games so a sticky pitch is rarely seen in first-class cricket. The phrase, however, has retained currency and extended beyond cricket to mean any difficult situation.

As a match progresses, the pitch dries out. The Laws of Cricket bar watering the pitch during a match. As it dries out, initially batting becomes easier as any moisture disappears. Over the course of a four or five-day match, however, the pitch begins to crack, then crumble and become dusty. This kind of pitch is colloquially known as a 'dust bowl' or 'minefield'. This again favours bowlers, particularly spin bowlers who can obtain large amounts of traction on the surface and make the ball spin a long way. The relative deterioration and spin-friendliness of a pitch are often referred to by mentioning the number of days it has (or appears to have been) played on. A pitch which produces prodigious turn is referred to as a "Turner." When it produces a great deal of spin, it can be called a "square", "raging", or "rank" turner.

This change in the relative difficulties of batting and bowling as the state of the pitch changes during a match is one of the primary strategic considerations that the captain of the team that wins the coin toss will take into account when deciding which team will bat first and can accordingly finalise his decisions.

Pitch condition
Pitches in different parts of the world have different characteristics. The nature of the pitch plays an important role in the actual game: it may have a significant influence on team selection and other aspects. Pitches in hot and dry climates or seasons tend to have less grass on them, making batting easier. Batters or bowlers can have different levels of success based on the region they are in, and this is partially due to variation in pitches. As the pitch deteriorates throughout a match, this can also have considerable influence on the success or failure of a team's bowling or batting efforts.

Pitch safety
Certain conditions, as set out by the ICC, must be met to ensure that a pitch is fit and safe to play on. If the pitch is found to excessively favour one side, or if other conditions cause it to be dangerous, the match may, after agreement between the captains and the umpires, be abandoned and possibly rescheduled.

Preparation and maintenance of the playing area

Law 9 of the Laws of Cricket sets out rules covering the preparation and maintenance of the playing area.

Uncovered pitches
Cricket was initially played on uncovered pitches. Uncovered pitches began to be phased out in the 1960s.

Covering the pitch
The pitch is said to be covered when the groundskeepers have placed covers on it to protect it against rain or dew. The use or non-use of covers significantly affects the way the ball comes off the pitch, making the matter potentially controversial. Law 11 of the Laws of Cricket provides that during the match the pitch shall not be completely covered unless provided otherwise by regulations or by agreement before the toss. When possible, the bowlers' run ups are covered in inclement weather to keep them dry. If the pitch is covered overnight, the covers are removed in the morning at the earliest possible moment on each day that play is expected to take place. If covers are used during the day as protection from inclement weather or if inclement weather delays the removal of overnight covers, they are removed as soon as conditions allow. Excess water can be removed from a pitch or the outfield using a machine called a water hog.

Rolling the pitch
During the match, the captain of the batting side may request the rolling of the pitch for a period of not more than 7 minutes before the start of each innings (other than the first innings of the match) and before the start of each subsequent day's play. In addition, if, after the toss and before the first innings of the match, the start is delayed, the captain of the batting side may request to have the pitch rolled for not more than 7 minutes, unless the umpires together agree that the delay has had no significant effect on the state of the pitch. Once the game has begun, rolling may not take place other than in these circumstances.

If there is more than one roller available, the captain of the batting side shall have the choice. Detailed rules exist to make sure that, where possible, rolling takes place without delaying the game but the game is delayed if necessary to allow the batting captain to have up to 7 minutes rolling if they so wish. Rolling the pitch can take a long time but will be very effective once done.  Rolling of the pitch is crucial to whether it is better for a batter or a bowler.

For the 2010 County Championship season, the heavy roller was banned from use during a County Championship match. The belief was that the heavy roller was helping to make pitches flat, and therefore producing too many drawn games.

Sweeping
Before a pitch is rolled it is first swept to avoid any possible damage caused by rolling in debris. The pitch is also cleared of any debris at all intervals for meals, between innings and at the beginning of each day. The only exception to this is that the umpires do not allow sweeping to take place where they consider it may be detrimental to the surface of the pitch.

Mowing
Groundskeepers mow the pitch on each day of a match on which play is expected to take place. Once a game has begun, mowings take place under the supervision of the umpires.

Footholes and footholds
The umpires are required to make sure that bowlers' and batter's footholes are cleaned out and dried whenever necessary to facilitate play. In matches of more than one day's duration, if necessary, the footholes made by the bowler in his delivery stride may be returfed or covered with quick-setting fillings to make them safe and secure. Players may also secure their footholes using sawdust provided that the pitch is not damaged or they do not do so in a way that is unfair to the other team.

Research
England is the hub for considerable research in the preparation of cricket pitches, with Cranfield University working with the ECB and The Institute of Groundsmanship (IOG).

Practising on the field
The rules do not allow players to practise bowling or batting on the pitch, or on the area parallel and immediately adjacent to the pitch, at any time on any day of the match. Practice on a day of a match on any other part of the cricket square may take place only before the start of play or after the close of play on that day and must cease 30 minutes before the scheduled start of play or if detrimental to the surface of the square.

Typically players do practise on the field of play, but not on the cricket square, during the game. Also bowlers sometimes practise run ups during the game. However, no practice or trial run-up is permitted on the field of play during play if it could result in a waste of time. The rules concerning practice on the field are covered principally by Law 26 of the Laws of Cricket.

Drop-in pitches
A drop-in pitch is a pitch that is prepared away from the ground or venue in which it is used, and "dropped" into place for a match to take place. This allows multi-purpose venues to host other sports and events with more versatility than a dedicated cricket ground would allow. Much like an integral pitch, a quality drop-in pitch takes several years to cultivate, grounds would maintain and utilise each drop-in pitch over multiple seasons, and pitches can deteriorate over many years to the point that they need to be retired.

They were first developed by WACA curator John Maley for use in the World Series Cricket matches, set up in the 1970s by Australian businessman Kerry Packer. Drop-in pitches became necessary for the World Series as they had to play in dual purpose venues operating outside of the cricket establishment. Along with other revolutions during the series including the white ball, floodlights, helmets, and coloured clothing, drop-in pitches were designed to also make games more interesting. They would start off bowler friendly seaming and spinning with uneven bounce for the first two days of a game. After that they became extremely easy for batting meaning high targets were chaseable on the fourth and fifth days, although there would still be something in the pitch for the bowlers.

In 2005, the Brisbane Cricket Ground (the "Gabba") rejected the use of a drop-in pitch, despite requests from the ground's other users, the Brisbane Lions AFL team. Although drop-in pitches are regularly used in the Melbourne Cricket Ground and in New Zealand, Queensland Cricket stated that Brisbane's weather and the difference in performance meant they preferred to prepare the ground in the traditional way.

Plans to use drop-in pitches in baseball parks in the United States have met with problems due to strict rules about transporting soil over American state lines. It has been found that the best soil types for drop-in pitches are not located in the same states which have been targeted by cricketing authorities – New York, California and Florida.

Related usages
The word pitch also refers to the bouncing of the ball, usually on the pitch. In this context, the ball is said to pitch before it reaches the batter. Where the ball pitches can be qualified as pitched short (bouncing nearer the bowler), pitched up (nearer the batter), or pitched on a length (somewhere in between).

Unlike in baseball, the word pitch does not refer to the act of propelling the ball towards the batter in cricket. In cricket this is referred to as bowling.  This action is also referred to as a delivery.

Other sports
In baseball, some baseball fields used to have a dirt path between the pitcher's mound and the batter's box, similar to the pitch.

References

External links

 MCC
 Principles and practice of pitch preparation
 Cricket Gk questions

Grass field surfaces
Cricket captaincy and tactics
Cricket laws and regulations
Cricket terminology
Cricket